James Stephanie Sterling, also known as Jim Sterling, is an English-American freelance video game journalist, critic, pundit, YouTuber, and professional wrestler. Before becoming independent in September 2014, they were the review editor for Destructoid, and an author for The Escapist. Sterling is noted as one of the main examples of a YouTuber achieving success through crowdfunding.

Career

Video game critic
Sterling presents The Jimquisition, a weekly YouTube video series in which they discuss current issues surrounding video games, often involving consumer protection and ethics in the video game industry. The series originated on Destructoid's YouTube channel and was later moved to The Escapists channel, before being released on Sterling's own channel. Their main gameplay series are "Jimpressions" and "Squirty Play", where they discuss their impressions of a recently released video game while showing their own pre-recorded gameplay. They have often spoken against sexism in gaming, and have been open about the fact that their position on this subject has slowly evolved.

In November 2014, Sterling announced that they were leaving The Escapist and intended to seek funding for their work independently through Patreon. On a 2020 episode of The Jimquisition, they stated that they had departed The Escapist after the publication had refused to publish their negative review of Assassin's Creed Unity, citing that parent company Defy Media was afraid of damaging any sponsorship opportunities with Ubisoft. Sterling also stated their desire to go back to writing articles and recording podcasts, which they were not able to do since leaving Destructoid. They currently maintain their own website, The Jimquisition, in addition to producing a podcast titled "Podquisition", which is shared with fellow British game journalist and founding host, Laura Kate Dale. The third founding member/co-host, Irish musician Gavin Dunne, had his final permanent appearance on episode 250, leaving to pursue a musical career. Gavin was replaced on episode 251 with Conrad Zimmerman, who had previously worked alongside Sterling at Destructoid.

In March 2016, Digital Homicide Studios filed a lawsuit against Sterling, seeking $10 million in damages for "assault, libel, and slander", following Sterling's negative review of their first game The Slaughtering Grounds. Sterling further accused Digital Homicide Studios of deleting negative feedback of the game on its Steam review page, and banning users who criticized it. The lawsuit was raised to $15 million, before it was eventually dismissed with prejudice in late February 2017.

Sterling has been credited with coining the term "Chungus", which would later be part of the name of the "Big Chungus" meme. Sterling started using the term as early as 2012 on their channel in a variety of unrelated contexts with different meanings for humorous effect.

Wrestling
Sterling wrestles under the name Commander Sterling. Sterling initially became involved in wrestling as a joke, appearing as a character called Sterdust, parodying Cody Rhodes’ character Stardust, later appearing as a heel manager, before taking up wrestling themselves, also as a heel. They have wrestled for promotions including Pro Wrestling EGO, Ryse Wrestling, BadBoys Wrestling (BBW), and the PolyAm Cult Party. They co-founded and run wrestling promotion Spectrum Wrestling.

Reception
In 2011 Sterling was featured in a list of "the 25 raddest game journalists to follow on Twitter" by Complex. They have developed into a controversial figure in the world of video game journalism, particularly for their criticisms of industry practices and focus on consumer protection. Fans of some highly anticipated games, including No Man's Sky and The Legend of Zelda: Breath of the Wild, have launched DDoS attacks against Sterling's website following reviews that were believed to be insufficiently positive.

Sterling's views on art games have been criticized by Spelunky creator Derek Yu. Yu compared Sterling's view to that of art critic Louis Leroy in 1874 of a Claude Monet painting, which Leroy criticized for being unfinished, while the style of painting would later become a major art style.

Personal life
Sterling was born in London, England, where they lived near the poverty line for much of their childhood and were emotionally abused by their mother's partner. This abuse is what prompted them to take on the "Jim Sterling" name, saying that they would have had it legally changed, if not for legal issues. In a video from November 2015, while talking about the polyamorous relationship options in Fallout 4, Sterling stated that they were "not a monogamous guy, nor [...] a straight one either." They are openly pansexual and queer. In June 2020, they became a naturalized United States citizen. In August 2020, Sterling came out as non-binary. Sterling uses they/them pronouns.

In late June 2020, while discussing the Speaking Out movement and misconduct within the video game industry, Sterling touched upon their own disorders: 

Sterling also has ADHD.

References

1984 births
20th-century LGBT people
21st-century LGBT people
American people of English descent
American YouTubers
English expatriates in the United States
English YouTubers
English LGBT entertainers
LGBT people from Mississippi
LGBT professional wrestlers
LGBT YouTubers
Living people
Naturalized citizens of the United States
Non-binary professional wrestlers
Non-binary sportspeople
Non-binary writers
Pansexual non-binary people
Patreon creators
People from Erith
People from Jackson, Mississippi
People with attention deficit hyperactivity disorder
People with bipolar disorder
People with post-traumatic stress disorder
Video game critics